Yo, Potro (stylized on screen as Club de Cuervos presenta: Yo, Potro, also known as I, Potro) is a Mexican web series that premiered on October 19, 2018.  It is set in a fake documentary format directed and written by Marcos Bucay for Netflix. It is a spin-off of the Mexican web series Club de Cuervos, and in turn is a special episode of the franchise. It stars Joaquín Ferreira as the titular character.

Plot 
The special revolves around Diego Armando Romani aka El Potro, a young Argentine who tries to record a documentary about his life. But suddenly he is notified that he has been fired from his current job, so he decides to go to his native Argentina; where he believes he will be received as a King. Already in his Argentina, he arrives at his brother's wedding where he realizes that he is not well received by him, and his friends, and from there, unexpected situations begin to happen and his life in excess is not well seen by all. Since his arrival, he has been told that he should not drink, get high, or go near his brother's family.

References 

Spanish-language Netflix original programming
Television spin-offs
Mockumentaries